Michel Van Vaerenbergh (21 February 1920 – 11 March 1986) was a Belgian footballer. He played in two matches for the Belgium national football team from 1946 to 1949.

References

External links
 

1920 births
1986 deaths
Belgian footballers
Belgium international footballers
Place of birth missing
Association football midfielders